Sandile Ndlovu (born 1 July 1980) is a South African former professional soccer player who played as a striker. He played for Premier Soccer League clubs Bloemfontein Celtic, Moroka Swallows, Maritzburg United, Dynamos and Mamelodi Sundowns, and the South Africa national team.

He hails from KwamaChibisa (Malinyane) Edendale near Pietermaritzburg.
2004-05 PSL Player's Player of the Season.

Fan where fans nicknamed him AK-47.

References

External links

1980 births
Living people
Sportspeople from Pietermaritzburg
Soccer players from KwaZulu-Natal
Zulu people
South African soccer players
Association football forwards
Mamelodi Sundowns F.C. players
Moroka Swallows F.C. players
Maritzburg United F.C. players
Bloemfontein Celtic F.C. players
Dynamos F.C. (South Africa) players
Roses United F.C. players
South Africa international soccer players